Cumberland County is a county located in the U.S. state of Illinois. As of the 2010 census, the population was 11,048. Its county seat is Toledo.

Cumberland County is part of the Charleston–Mattoon, IL Micropolitan Statistical Area.

History
Cumberland County was created on March 2, 1823, from parts of Coles County. It is named for the National Road (Cumberland Road), which was projected to run through it.

Geography

Climate and weather

Adjacent counties
 Coles County - north
 Clark County - east
 Jasper County - south
 Effingham County - southwest
 Shelby County - west

Major highways
  Interstate 57
  Interstate 70
  U.S. Route 40
  U.S. Route 45
  Illinois Route 49
  Illinois Route 121
  Illinois Route 130

Demographics

As of the 2010 United States Census, there were 11,048 people, 4,377 households, and 3,121 families living in the county. The racial makeup of the county was 98.3% white, 0.3% black or African American, 0.2% Asian, 0.2% American Indian, 0.2% from other races, and 0.8% from two or more races. Those of Hispanic or Latino origin made up 0.7% of the population. In terms of ancestry, 30.6% were German, 17.4% were American, 11.7% were Irish, and 11.4% were English.

Of the 4,377 households, 31.3% had children under the age of 18 living with them, 57.7% were married couples living together, 8.6% had a female householder with no husband present, 28.7% were non-families, and 24.3% of all households were made up of individuals. The average household size was 2.50 and the average family size was 2.95. The median age was 40.9 years.

The median income for a household in the county was $42,101 and the median income for a family was $51,729. Males had a median income of $42,157 versus $29,142 for females. The per capita income for the county was $21,262. About 8.1% of families and 12.5% of the population were below the poverty line, including 19.4% of those under age 18 and 8.2% of those age 65 or over.

Communities

Cities
 Neoga
 Casey (mostly in Clark County)

Villages
 Greenup
 Jewett
 Montrose (mostly in Effingham County)
 Toledo (seat)

Townships
Cumberland County is divided into eight townships:

 Cottonwood
 Crooked Creek
 Greenup
 Neoga
 Spring Point
 Sumpter
 Union
 Woodbury

Unincorporated Communities

 Bradbury
 Dees
 Hazel Dell
 Janesville
 Johnstown
 Liberty Hill
 Lillyville
 Maple Point
 Neal
 Roslyn
 Timothy
 Union Center
 Vevay Park
 Walla Walla
 Woodbury

Politics
Although predominantly Democratic in the years before World War I, in the aftermath of which Woodrow Wilson’s policies towards Germany were locally deplored, Cumberland County has since become powerfully Republican. Even in Franklin D. Roosevelt’s 1932 and 1936 landslides, he won only small victories, and since then only three Democrats have carried the county. Bill Clinton, who won a plurality in 1992, is the last Democrat to reach forty percent of the county’s vote, and in 2016, the rapid Upland South trend towards overwhelmingly Republican voting caused his wife Hillary to win less than twenty percent of the county’s ballots.

See also
 National Register of Historic Places listings in Cumberland County, Illinois

References
 History of Southern Illinois, George Washington Smith, 1912.
 United States Census Bureau 2007 TIGER/Line Shapefiles
 United States Board on Geographic Names (GNIS)
 United States National Atlas

 
1843 establishments in Illinois
Populated places established in 1843
Illinois counties
Charleston–Mattoon, IL Micropolitan Statistical Area